The Yale Bulldogs men's lacrosse team represents Yale University in National Collegiate Athletic Association (NCAA) Division I men's lacrosse. Yale competes as a member of the Ivy League and plays their home games at Reese Stadium in New Haven, Connecticut. The Bulldogs have captured the Ivy League championship five times. Yale is credited, alongside Harvard and Princeton, with the 1883 national championship.

On May 28, 2018, the Bulldogs defeated Duke to claim their second ever national title and first NCAA championship in the sport. Yale returned to the championship game the following year, but lost to the Virginia Cavaliers in the 2019 championship final.

History
The first Yale lacrosse team was fielded in 1882 and joined the Intercollegiate Lacrosse Association the following year. The 1978 team, coached by Bob McHenry, was one of Yale's most exciting teams to watch in action.

Yale has made ten appearances in the NCAA tournament since its establishment in 1971. Their first appearance was in 1988, when they were eliminated in double overtime by Virginia, 10–9. In 1990, Yale earned a first-round bye, and then defeated Princeton, 17–9, for their first NCAA tournament win. The Bulldogs fell in the semifinals to Loyola, 14–13 in double overtime. Yale returned to the NCAA tournament in 1992, advancing through the first round with a win against Navy, 9–3, before being eliminated by Syracuse, 17–8.

Yale finished the 2010 season with a 10–4 record, but an Ivy League tournament semifinal loss to Princeton and a weak RPI kept them out of the NCAA field. The team finished the season ranked 18th in the Nike/Inside Lacrosse Men's Division I Media Poll.

Since 2010, under the direction of head coach Andy Shay, Yale has won ten or more games every season except 2014 when they won 9.  During that time they won or shared four Ivy League regular season titles, including 2 outright,  as well as participating in every Ivy League tournament since its inception in 2010, winning five of them. In addition during that span the Bulldogs have made 7 NCAA tournament appearances, winning 8 NCAA tournament games, culminating in a national championship in 2018, followed by a national championship runner-up finish in 2019.

Season results
The following is a list of Yale's results by season as an NCAA Division I program:

{| class="wikitable"

|- align="center"

}}

†NCAA canceled 2020 collegiate activities due to the COVID-19 virus.

External links
 Yale Bulldogs Lacrosse web site

References

 
1882 establishments in Connecticut
Lacrosse clubs established in 1882